Pacific Employers Insurance Co. v. Industrial Accident Commission, 306 U.S. 493 (1939), was a conflict of laws case decided by the United States Supreme Court, in which the court held that principles of federalism overcome the Full Faith and Credit Clause where a state is enforcing its own laws on events occurring within the state.

Facts
The plaintiff, a Massachusetts resident, was employed as a chemical engineer and research chemist by Dewey & Almy Chemical Company, a Massachusetts company. The employee traveled to California to visit a branch factory, where he was injured. The employee filed a lawsuit in California seeking compensation for his injuries. The employer tried to assert as a defense that under Massachusetts law, a person covered under Massachusetts workman's compensation waived the right to sue employer for damages. The California courts found the Massachusetts law inapplicable to an injury occurring in California, and the employee received an award under California employee compensation law. The insurance companies responsible for paying the award and subrogating the payment appealed.

Issue
The Supreme Court considered whether California's application of its own law to these circumstances violated the Full Faith and Credit Clause of the United States Constitution, which requires states to honor the laws of other states.

Result
The court unanimously held that the principle of federalism overcomes the Full Faith and Credit Clause – each state must be able to exercise its own laws within its own boundaries. In this case, there was no Full Faith and Credit Clause violation because California was merely applying its own law to events occurring in California.

External links
 

1939 in United States case law
United States Supreme Court cases
United States Supreme Court cases of the Hughes Court